Louise Lightner Post (born December 7, 1967) is an American musician. She is best known for being a vocalist and guitarist of the alternative rock band Veruca Salt, which she co-founded with Nina Gordon in 1992.

Career 

Shortly after meeting Nina Gordon, Post and Gordon co-founded the alternative rock band Veruca Salt in 1992 with bassist Steve Lack and drummer Jim Shapiro, Gordon's brother. Post and Gordon were the band's vocalists, guitarists, and songwriters. Veruca Salt released a self-funded demo tape and shopped it to labels while playing a handful of small club shows. After a few live concerts, the band was signed to Minty Fresh Records and began recording with producer Brad Wood, at the time known for having produced Liz Phair's critically acclaimed album Exile in Guyville (1993).

The band released a 7-inch single for the song "Seether". Their first full-length album, American Thighs, was released on September 27, 1994, and re-released on November 8, 1994, by Geffen Records. The album peaked on the Billboard chart at number 69, and was eventually certified Gold. Other singles on the album included "All Hail Me" and "Number One Blind". To support the album, the band toured as the opening act for bands such as Hole, Live, and PJ Harvey. In 1996, Veruca Salt released an EP, Blow It Out Your Ass It's Veruca Salt, produced by Steve Albini.

The group entered the studio with producer Bob Rock in 1996. Their second album, Eight Arms to Hold You, was released on February 11, 1997, and included the hit "Volcano Girls", which was the opening theme for dark comedy film Jawbreaker. Another single, "Shutterbug", was performed by the band on Saturday Night Live.

In 1998, Gordon left the band, and Post recruited new members. They then released another album, Resolver (2000). The band's new line-up toured in summer 2001 and promoted the album in the United Kingdom. Resolver was released in Australia in 2003 and promoted with both a tour and the release of a tour EP, Officially Dead, in 2003.

In 2005, the band toured Australia and released another EP, Lords of Sounds and Lesser Things, followed by a full-length album, IV (2006). In 2007, the group covered Neil Young's song "Burned" for a breast cancer benefit album and then went dormant. In 2012, the band's hiatus was announced on their official website.

In 2013, Veruca Salt announced the reunion of its original line-up on their Facebook page; on September 29, 2013, it was announced that they were working on new material, set to be released in 2014. On April 19, 2014, for Record Store Day, the band released a 10-inch vinyl disc, MMXIV, containing two new songs, "It's Holy" and "The Museum of Broken Relationships". In 2014, the band played several dates in the United States and Australia. The first post-reunion Veruca Salt album, Ghost Notes, was released on July 10, 2015, to favorable reviews.

Personal life 

Post and bandmate Nina Gordon were very close friends for much of Veruca Salt's early years. By the late 1990s, the personal disagreements between the two increased, resulting in the departure of Gordon from the band. Veruca Salt's 2000 album, Resolver, the first one released without Gordon, contains lyrics that have been interpreted as "hostile" towards her; however, the two never explained the reasons behind their falling out publicly. In 2003, Post stated that the two had reconciled and were friends, but "not at the same intensity". In October 2006, Post complimented Gordon's solo career. In 2013, it was announced that Gordon had returned to Veruca Salt, with Post referring to her as "[her] best friend".

In the late 1990s, Post was in a relationship with Foo Fighters' leader and former Nirvana drummer Dave Grohl. Grohl has said that the Foo Fighters song "Everlong" (on which Post sang backing vocals, recorded over a telephone line from Chicago to Los Angeles) is about Post. Following their break-up, Post, during an inebriated performance in Melbourne in 1997, stated that Grohl had left her for  Winona Ryder. In 2006, Post stated: "It was a private relationship, but it got so much publicity. I didn't mean for it to happen. I'm friends with him now."

Post began dating The Brontosaur's frontman, musician Tony Parks, in 2001. The couple were married on March 30, 2008, in Las Vegas and have one child born in 2010.

In October 2017, Post was one of 38 women who publicly accused film director James Toback of sexual harassment. That number later grew to nearly 400.

Discography

With Veruca Salt 
 American Thighs (1994)
 Blow It Out Your Ass It's Veruca Salt EP (1996)
 Eight Arms to Hold You (1997)
 Resolver (2000)
 Officially Dead EP (2003)
 Lords of Sounds and Lesser Things EP (2005)
 IV (2006)
 The track "Burned" on Cinnamon Girl: Women Artists Cover Neil Young for Charity (2008)
 MMXIV EP (2014)
 Ghost Notes (2015)

As Louise Post

Studio Albums 

 TBA (2023)

EPs 
 But I Love You Without Mascara (Demos '97-'98) (2022)

Appearances 

 Loud Lucy – "Stop Draggin' My Heart Around" from You Got Lucky – A Tribute to Tom Petty (1994)
 Loud Lucy – Breathe on the song "Over Me"

 Touch (OST) the songs "Touch" and "Saints In Love" with Dave Grohl (1997)
 The Avengers (1998) (OST) "Solve My Problems" with Ashtar Command
 Frogpond – Safe Ride Home (1999)

 Firetrucs – Hovercraft LP (2002) "Breathe" and "Telephone"
 The Still Life (2006 film) (OST) Piano version of "Spiderman '79" (2006)
 Cinnamon Girl – Women Artists Cover Neil Young for Charity - "Sugar Mountain" (2008)
 Ashtar Command – American Sunshine, Vol. 1 (2011)
 Skating Polly – New Trick (2017) – EP Collaboration between Skating Polly, Louise Post and Nina Gordon

References

External links 

 
 Veruca Salt Returns, Illinois Entertainer (2005-12-30).

1967 births
Living people
20th-century American women singers
20th-century American women guitarists
20th-century American guitarists
21st-century American women guitarists
21st-century American guitarists
American women singer-songwriters
American women rock singers
American rock songwriters
American rock guitarists
Singer-songwriters from Missouri
Guitarists from Missouri
Musicians from St. Louis
Slide guitarists
Veruca Salt members
Barnard College alumni
20th-century American singers